Tropical Storm Agatha was the deadliest tropical cyclone to form during the 1992 Pacific hurricane season, killing 10 people as it passed offshore Mexico. The third named storm of the record-breaking season, Agatha developed as a tropical depression off the Pacific coast of Mexico on June 1. The storm gradually organized over the next several hours. As it moved northward, the depression intensified into Tropical Storm Agatha later that day. After reaching its peak winds as a strong tropical storm, Agatha steadily weakened while turning to the west. The system was downgraded to a tropical depression on June 5, and subsequently lost its tropical characteristics the next day. Although Agatha never made landfall, the storm's outer rainbands triggered widespread flooding that killed ten people.

Meteorological history

On May 26, a tropical wave—or a quasi-equatorward area of low pressure—moved off the Central American coast into the east Pacific. Over the subsequent days the system produced a broad area of convection, which began to show signs of organization on May 29. At the time, the depression maintained good outflow aloft; it was forecast to strengthen into a minimal hurricane after three days. Based on a combination of ship data and Dvorak intensity estimates, the system was upgraded into Tropical Storm Agatha on June 2.

For the first two days of its duration, Agatha steered toward the north while embedded within a deep southerly flow. Steady intensification continued, and the storm reached winds of 50 mph (90 km/h) six hours after being upgraded as it neared the coast of Mexico. By the afternoon of June 2, the center exhibited an elongated appearance within its associated central dense overcast, a large area of organized mid-tropospheric convection. Around 1800 UTC that same day, the storm peaked in intensity with winds of 70 mph (110 km/h) and a minimum pressure of 990 mbar (hPa; 29.23 inHg).

Although specialists at the NHC had anticipated a Category 1-hurricane landfall on the territory, the storm defied predictions and stayed at sea. The center of the storm promptly became ill-defined on infrared satellite imagery, simultaneously recurving to the west. Agatha continued to degenerate quickly into the morning of June 4, with a ragged appearance observed on satellite imagery. By 0600 UTC June 5, the storm was downgraded back into tropical depression status prior to dissipating the next day.

Preparations and impact

On June 2, forecasters at the National Hurricane Center anticipated Agatha to make landfall in Mexico near hurricane strength. In light of this, a tropical storm warning and hurricane watch were issued for the Pacific coast of Mexico between Tenexpa to Cabo Corrites around 2100 UTC that day. Additionally, heavy rains from the system prompted concerns over mudslides and flash floods. Following Agatha's turn towards the west early on June 3, the watches and warnings were discontinued. Roughly 1,500 people evacuated from coastal areas of Michoacán due to the threat of damaging winds and flooding.

Although the center of Agatha remained offshore, heavy rains within the system's outer rainbands impacted southwestern and central Mexico. Widespread flooding and mudslides killed ten people and left thousands homeless.

See also

Other storms with the same name
1992 Pacific hurricane season

References

Agatha
Agatha 1992
Agatha 1992